Silawan Intamee (born 22 January 1994) is a Thai professional footballer who plays as a midfielder.

International goals

References

External links 
 
 
 

1994 births
Living people
Women's association football midfielders
Silawan Intamee
2015 FIFA Women's World Cup players
Silawan Intamee
Footballers at the 2014 Asian Games
Silawan Intamee
Silawan Intamee
Southeast Asian Games medalists in football
Footballers at the 2018 Asian Games
Competitors at the 2017 Southeast Asian Games
2019 FIFA Women's World Cup players
Silawan Intamee
Competitors at the 2019 Southeast Asian Games